Mala Kopašnica is a village in the municipality of Leskovac, Serbia. According to the 2002 census, the village had a population of 255.

References

Populated places in Jablanica District